The Amy Winehouse Foundation is a registered charity in England and Wales (number 1143740), set up in memory of English singer-songwriter Amy Winehouse (1983–2011).

After Amy Winehouse's untimely death, on 23 July 2011 from alcohol poisoning at the age of 27, the foundation was set up by Winehouse's family and launched on 14 September 2011 (which would have been Winehouse's 28th birthday). Its aim is to help vulnerable or disadvantaged young people and it works with other charitable organisations to provide frontline support. Its central office is in North London, but it also has an office in New York (operating under the name 'The Amy Winehouse Foundation US'). Jon Snow and Mark Ronson are patrons for the charity, and ambassadors include Jess Glynne, Kiera Chaplin and Mica Paris. The late Barbara Windsor was also a patron.

Focus

The Foundation’s work focuses on three core areas:

 To inform and educate young people about the effects of drug and alcohol misuse, as well as to support those seeking help for their problems and those needing on-going support in their recovery
To provide support for those most vulnerable, including those who are disadvantaged through circumstance or at high risk of substance misuse.
To support the personal development of disadvantaged young people through music.

The Foundation was established with royalties from the sales of 2011's Lioness: Hidden Treasures album (with £1 per album going to the charity), and also the sales of Amy - My Daughter, a biography of Winehouse written by her father, Mitch Winehouse. As of 2012/13, the charity relies on donations from the general public and fundraising events to continue its work. Such events include the auction of the iconic polka dot chiffon dress worn by Winehouse on the cover of her critically acclaimed second album Back to Black - with a winning bid of £36,000 GBP.

The Amy Winehouse Resilience Programme

On 12 March 2013, the Foundation launched the Amy Winehouse Foundation Resilience Programme For Schools with the help of ex-addict Russell Brand. The programme aims to provide effective education around drugs, alcohol and dealing with emotional issues to secondary schools across the UK. On 4 June 2013, the Mayor of Camden Town, Jonathan Simpson, wrote an article for the Huffington Post in support of the programme.

Amy's Yard
One of the Amy Winehouse Foundations’ main areas of focus is ‘to support the personal development of disadvantaged young people through music’. Since the Foundation began we have met countless young people with immense talent who are simply held back by not being able to access professional studio time due to the costs and lack of provision. The Foundation therefore decided to develop Amy’s very own studio and share it with some of the young people from the partner organisations we work with.

On 14 September 2015 (which would have been Winehouse's 32nd birthday), the Amy Winehouse Foundation released their first album Amy's Yard - The Sessions: Volume 1 in partnership with Island Records. The album features tracks completed by young artists who have been involved within "Amy's Yard Programme".

Patrons
 
Barbara Windsor (until 2020)
Jon Snow
Mark Ronson
Nas
Monte Lipman

Trustees
 
 Mitchell Winehouse
 Janis Winehouse
 Jane Winehouse
 Richard Collins
 Jonathan Simpson
 Barry Yin
 Yogesh Dewan
 Professor Stephen Lee
 Michael Winehouse
 Melissa Rice

Events
Since its launch on 14 September 2011, the Amy Winehouse Foundation have done a series of events on every birthday of Amy Winehouse. In 2013 (when it would have been Winehouse's 30th birthday), the charity widely celebrated the birthday by doing an exhibition at the Jewish Museum in Camden Town, creating a shop that was for a limited amount of time, named Amy's Pop-Up Shop in Camden Town, a picture gallery entitled as For You I Was A Flame at the Proud Gallery and various performances took place from people involved with the foundation.

In 2014, a Statue of Amy Winehouse was unveiled at Stables Market in Camden Town, done by Scott Eaton. Winehouse's parents Mitch & Janis were in attendance for the event, as well as Winehouse's friend, Barbara Windsor.

In 2015, an album was released on Winehouse's birthday, entitled as Amy's Yard - The Sessions: Volume 1. The project sees young people with a musical talent mentored to become self-sustaining music artists. They are given time in Amy's own studio and are guided by producer Urban Monk who has worked with the likes of Giggs, Wiley, Plan B, Ghetts, Lily Allen and Mr Hudson.

References

External links

 Amy Winehouse Foundation - Charity Commission for England and Wales

Foundation
Foundations based in the United Kingdom
Organizations established in 2011
2011 establishments in the United Kingdom
Medical and health organisations based in London

it:Amy Winehouse#Amy Winehouse Foundation